Trinity Cathedral is a Russian Orthodox church in Leninsky City District of Novosibirsk, Russia.

History
August 24, 2013, the cathedral was consecrated by Patriarch Kirill.

References

Churches in Siberia
Russian Orthodox cathedrals in Russia
Churches in Novosibirsk
Leninsky District, Novosibirsk